Aleksey Vladimirovich Dyachenko (a.k.a. Aleksei Diachenko; ; born 11 November 1978) is a Russian sabre fencer and a commercial pilot in the United States.

Personal life
He is the son of fencing coaches Vladimir and Natalya Dyachenko. His sister Yekaterina is a world champion sabre fencer.

Sport career 
Dyachenko took part in the team sabre event for the 2000 Summer Olympics in Sydney as a reserve of the Russia team, which won a gold medal. He qualified as a full member of the team to the 2004 Summer Olympics in Athens. In the individual event he lost in the first round to Ukraine's Volodymyr Kaliuzhniy. In the team event, Russia overcame Greece, but fell to Italy in the semifinals. They defeated the United States by a single hit to win the bronze medal. Dyatchenko only participated in the quarter final.

Dyachenko is also a three-time world champion with the Russian team.

Commercial pilot career 
In 2013 he began training in the United States to obtain a commercial pilot license. Upon completion of training, he flew as first officer and pilot in command on the Pilatus PC-12 aircraft in Tradewind Aviation and ExpressJet Airlines. Since October 2020, he has been flying as a co-pilot on the Embraer ERJ 145 aircraft in the CommutAir company. Upon reaching the flight time of 5,000 hours, he is going to work for a large passenger airline.

References

External links
 Profile at the European Fencing Confederatiuon
 Olympic.org.  Sabre Team Men Results.  Bronze Medals section.
 NBC Sports.  Medal Winners - Fencing.   Fencing — Men's Team Sabre (medals: August 19)

1978 births
Living people
Russian male sabre fencers
Fencers at the 2004 Summer Olympics
Olympic fencers of Russia
Olympic bronze medalists for Russia
Olympic medalists in fencing
Sportspeople from Saint Petersburg
Medalists at the 2004 Summer Olympics
Commercial aviators